The Cayman Islands national rugby sevens team is a minor national rugby sevens side. The Cayman Islands has competed at the Commonwealth Sevens. They made their debut at the Hong Kong Sevens in 2016 making them the 60th team to play at Hong Kong.

Players

Previous Squads

Tournament History

Olympics 
The Cayman Islands has not qualified for the Olympics.

World Rugby Sevens Series 
2016 Hong Kong Sevens

Pool E

See also
 Cayman Islands national rugby union team 
 Cayman Islands women's national rugby union team
 Rugby union in the Cayman Islands

References

Rugby union in the Cayman Islands
National rugby sevens teams
Rugby sevens